The diplomatic ranks in the Russian Federation were introduced with enactment of the Federal Law of 27 July 2010 No.205-FZ. Diplomatic ranks are not to be confused with diplomatic positions.

Uniform and insignia (patches, stitched over the place for a buttonholes) for Russian diplomats were established by the Government of Russia Decree of 17 November 2001 No.799.

Ranks and insignia

See also
 State civilian and municipal service ranks in Russian Federation
 Prosecutor's ranks in Russian Federation
 Special ranks in Investigative Committee of Russia
 Army ranks and insignia of the Russian Federation
 Naval ranks and insignia of the Russian Federation

References

Diplomatic service of the Russian Federation
Diplomatic service ranks in the Russian Federation
Diplomatic ranks in the Russian Federation